Scooter may refer to:

Vehicles

Ground

Human or gravity powered
 Eccentric-hub scooter, propelled by a standing rider making a bouncing motion
 Kick scooter, propelled by a standing rider pushing off the ground
 Knee scooter, a mobility device used as an alternative to the traditional crutch

Motorized land vehicles
 Scooter (motorcycle), a motorcycle with a step-through frame, a seat, and a platform for the rider's feet
 Mobility scooter, a wheelchair with a motor
 Motorized scooter, a powered vehicle similar to a kick scooter, ridden standing up
 Self-balancing scooter, a dicycle with an electric motor, ridden standing up

Air
 "Scooter", a nickname for the Douglas A-4 Skyhawk ground-attack aircraft
 Ace Scooter, an American aircraft designed for homebuilt construction
 AirScooter, a proposed ultralight helicopter design from the early 2000s
 Sopwith Scooter, an unarmed parasol monoplane
 SCOOTER, callsign for the airline Scoot

Water
 Bay scooter or ice scooter, a vehicle for quick travel across water, ice or snow
 Diving scooter, an underwater vehicle for divers
 Water scooter, a recreational watercraft

Arts and entertainment

Fictional characters
 Scooter (Borderlands), a mechanic in the video game series
 Scooter (Coronation Street), a boyfriend of Sarah Platt
 Scooter (Gobots), the Guardians' resident inventor in the toyline
 Scooter (How I Met Your Mother character), Lily's high-school boyfriend
 Scooter (Muppet), the stage manager of the in-universe Muppet Show
 Scooter (SpongeBob SquarePants), a purple fish who enjoys surfing
 Scooter (talking baseball), an animated character used in Fox Sports broadcasts
 Scooter, the protagonist of Swing with Scooter, a DC comic book published in the late 1960s
 Scooter, a nickname for J. D., the main protagonist of the TV series Scrubs
 Scooter, a character in Disney's 2008 film College Road Trip
 Scooter McNutty, a squirrel from Barney & Friends
 Scooter (VeggieTales), a carrot in the Christian children's media franchise

Music
 Scooter (Belgian band), a pop group
 Scooter (band), a German dance and trance group

Other uses in arts and entertainment
 Scooter, a novel by Mick Foley
 Scooter: Secret Agent, a children's television program named after the title character

Science
 Scooter (bird), or scoter, a genus of seaducks
 Water scooters (Gerridae), a family of waterbugs
 The Scooter (Neptune), a storm on the planet Neptune

People
 Scooter (nickname)
 Young Scooter, stage name of American rapper Edward Bailey (born 1986)

Other uses
 Scooter (skirt), a pair of shorts resembling a skirt
 Scooter pie, a marshmallow-filled cookie sandwich with a flavored coating

See also
 List of motor scooter manufacturers and brands
 Scooter Girl (disambiguation)
 Scooterboy, one of several scooter-related subcultures
 Scootering (disambiguation)